Rhodri Francis Evans (born 6 December 1989) is a Welsh cricketer. Evans is a left-handed batsman who bowls right-arm medium pace. He was born in Swansea, Glamorgan.

Evans made his debut for Wales Minor Counties in the 2007 Minor Counties Championship against Oxfordshire. He has played Minor counties cricket for Wales Minor Counties from 2007 to present, which has included 9 Minor Counties Championship appearances and 7 MCCA Knockout Trophy matches.

While studying at Loughborough University, Evans made his first-class debut for Loughborough UCCE against Kent in 2009. He made 3 further first-class appearances for Loughborough UCCE against, the last of which came against Yorkshire. In his 4 first-class matches, he scored 67 runs at an average of 16.75, with a high score of 44. With the ball, he took 2 wickets at an expensive bowling average of 108.50, with best figures of 1/57.

References

External links
 Rhodri Evans at ESPNcricinfo
 Rhodri Evans at CricketArchive

1989 births
Living people
Cricketers from Swansea
Welsh cricketers
Wales National County cricketers
Loughborough MCCU cricketers